Artists For Humanity (AFH) is a non-profit youth arts and enterprise organization based at 100 West Second Street in South Boston, Massachusetts, United States.

Artists For Humanity provides inner-city youth with keys to self-sufficiency through paid employment in the arts. It operates on the belief that exposure to the arts can be a productive and life-changing opportunity for young people. Bridging economic, racial, and social divisions, AFH works to restore urban neighborhoods by introducing young people’s creativity to the business community.

Goals

The organization seeks to provide young artists with:
 A place where they are respected for their contributions,
 A voice—through exhibitions, commercial services, and presentations,
 The respect and responsibility of paid employment, which promotes financial awareness and self-esteem

The Youth-Run Arts Micro-Enterprise

AFH’s central program, the Youth-Run Arts Micro-Enterprise, is a year-round apprenticeship and leadership program that employs inner-city teens during out-of-school time. AFH partners small groups of youth with professional artists/designers and young artist mentors to design, create and sell art products. With staffed studios in five artistic media – painting/murals, sculpture/industrial design, silk-screen, graphic design and photography/web design, youth and mentors collaborate on creative projects, many commissioned by clients. In the process, young artists develop entrepreneurial skills, as they are encouraged to participate in outreach and marketing of projects.

The Artists For Humanity EpiCenter

In September 2004, Artists For Humanity completed its 100% renewable energy EpiCenter, a 23,500 square foot center designed and developed to house expanded programming and gallery in Boston's Fort Point artist district. The EpiCenter provides Boston's young people with studio and gallery space. In October 2005, the United States Green Building Council awarded the Artists For Humanity EpiCenter a LEED Platinum certification – the highest honor for sustainable architecture. In 2007 the EpiCenter was awarded the Rudy Bruner Award for Urban Excellence silver medal.  The EpiCenter was also recognized with ten awards for design excellence.

Social enterprise and social justice
Artists For Humanity strives to cultivate social justice by fusing art and enterprise in the context of respect, responsibility, and meaningful relationships. By involving artists in the community and connecting artists with business, Artists For Humanity hopes to foster artistic growth and change perceptions.

References

External links
 Artists For Humanity

Charities based in Massachusetts
Non-profit organizations based in Boston
Cultural organizations based in Massachusetts
South Boston
Youth organizations based in Massachusetts